Epactionotus bilineatus is a species of catfish in the family Loricariidae. It is native to South America, where it occurs in the Maquiné and Três Forquilhas basins. It reaches 4 cm (1.6 inches) SL.

References 

Otothyrinae
Taxa named by Roberto Esser dos Reis
Taxa named by Scott Allen Schaefer
Fish described in 1998